Decarli is an Italian surname. Notable people with the name include the following:

Bruno Decarli (1877–1950), German actor
Saulo Decarli (born 1992), Swiss footballer

See also

Surnames of South Tyrolean origin
Italian-language surnames